Mallis is a surname. Notable people with the surname include:

 Arnold Mallis (1910–1984), American entomologist
 Fern Mallis (born 1948), executive director of the Council of Fashion Designers of America (CFDA) from 1991–2001

See also
 Malice (disambiguation)
 Malliß, municipality of Mecklenburg-Vorpommern, Germany
 Mount Mallis, mountain in Antarctica